Stephen Steinberg is an American sociologist, currently a Distinguished Professor at Queens College, who is noted for his work on ethnicity. Recently he has produced a critique on sociology.

References

Year of birth missing (living people)
Living people
Queens College, City University of New York faculty
American sociologists
University of California, Berkeley alumni